Mitani is a Japanese surname. Notable people with this name include:
 Koichiro Mitani (born 1968), judoka
 Kōki Mitani (born 1961), playwright
 Minatsu Mitani (born 1991), badminton player
 Mitsuo Mitani (born 1959), politician
 Mitani Takanobu (1892–1985), government official

Japanese-language surnames